Aghaweenagh (Irish derived place name, either Achadh an Bhuí Eanaigh meaning 'The Field of the Yellow Bog' or Achadh Mhuimhneach meaning 'The Field of the Munstermen'.) is a townland in the civil parish of Kildallan, barony of Tullyhunco, County Cavan, Ireland.

Geography

Aghaweenagh is bounded on the west by Clontygrigny townland, on the east by Berrymount and Killygreagh townlands, on the south by Ardlougher townland and on the north by Fartrin and Mullynagolman townlands. Its chief geographical features are Togher Lough, Greenville Lough, the Rag River, small streams, forestry plantations, a dug well and spring wells. Aghaweenagh is traversed by minor public roads and rural lanes. The townland covers 375 acres, including 16 acres of water. Until the 18th century the townland of Callaghs formed a sub-division of Aghaweenagh.

History

A 1587 petition spell the name as Aghewehan. The 1609 Plantation of Ulster Baronial map depicts the townland as split into two parts Teyriah (Irish derived place name, probably Tuath Riabhach meaning the Grey-Striped Land) and Mollachsifine. A Plantation of Ulster grant dated 1611 spells the names as Owtony otherwise Tewreagh and Mullaghsiffin. A 1624 inquisition spells the name as Aghewynaghe otherwise Tevereoghe. The 1641 Depositions spell the townland as Aighavenaigh and Aighaveny. The 1652 Commonwealth Survey spells the townland as Aghoinagh. The 1665 Down Survey map depicts it as Aughweenah and Aughwenagh. William Petty's map of 1685 depicts it as Aghwonod and Aghwonoh and Aghweengh.

From medieval times up to the early 1600s, the land belonged to the McKiernan Clan. On 7 November 1587 John McKiernan, the under-sheriff of County Westmeath, a native of Aghaweenagh, petitioned the government to appoint him the seneschal of Tullyhunco in order to civilise the natives.
Nov. 7. 4. Petition of John Kernan to Burghley. Humbly beseecheth your honourable Lordship, your orator, John Kernan, of Aghewehan, in the territory or cantred of Tolconchoe, alias M'Kernan's country, in the county of the Cavan, within the realm of Ireland, that it may please your Lordship with your favour to further his petition to Her Majesty for the grant of the reversion of the office of Clerk of Common Pleas in the Exchequer for his life, and of the seneschalship of the said cantred to him and to his heirs males of his body, in consideration of his endeavours in Her Majesty's service in the government of Sir William Fytzwylliams, Arthur Lord Grey, and the Lords Justices [Loftus and Wallop], and the rather that your said orator, through the entreaty of his kinsmen, the inhabitants of the said cantred, has left the English Pale to dwell among them, hoping, if convenient countenance be afforded to him by the said grant, to bring them, through dutiful exhortation, and examples of husbandry and other civil trades, from their disorders and disobedience to the due regard of loyalty and obedience. Your said orator presenteth unto your honourable Lordship the opinion and testimony of the Lord Grey and Sir William Fytzwylliams touching your orator by their several letters unto Mr. Secretary Walsyngham, being required so to do by his Honour, at his last being at the Court, since which time your orator hath dutifully attended your Honours and the other Lords of Her Majesty's most honourable Council for Her Majesty's most gracious pleasure in his said suit, and yet some seeking the disgrace of your orator have rumoured that he is suitor for the seneschalship of Meath and Westmeath long since, with the liberty and jurisdiction palatine of the said counties determined and annulled by parliament. Your orator's poor suit is none other than as hereby is declared, a matter of small profit to your orator and less charge to Her Majesty, and in regard thereof moved rather than anything more chargeable to Her Highness, whereof your orator hopeth that your Honour in your grave judgment will think him worthy. John McKiernan was granted the position by Fiant No. 5156 on 20 March 1588

Grant to John Kearnan, gent; of the office of seneschal of the territory of Upper Talconchoe alias M’Kearnans country in co. Cavan. To hold during good behavior, with all accustomed profits. With power to raise the inhabitants, and command them for defence of the territory, the public weal of the inhabitants, and the punishment of malefactors; to prosecute, banish, and punish by all means malefactors, rebels, vagabonds, rymors, Irish harpers, bards, bentules, carrowes, idle men and women, and those who assist such; and twice a year within a month after Easter and Michaelmas respectively to hold a court and law day. He shall not take any unlawful Irish exactions from the inhabitants, as to cess them with kern, nor impose coney or livery, without direction of the Lord Deputy.

At the beginning of the 17th century, Aghaweenagh belonged to Donald McKiernan, the son of Farrell Oge McKiernan. In an inquisition held at Cavan on 25 September 1609, one of the jurors was the said Donell McFerrall oge McKernan. In the Plantation of Ulster by grant dated 4 June 1611, King James VI and I granted part of Aghaweenagh containing 2 plowlands or 100 acres in Tewreagh otherwise Owtony to Donell mac Farrall Oge McKernan, gentleman, at an annual rent of £1-1s-4d. An inquisition held at Cavan on 21 October 1624 stated that- Donald mac Ferrall Oge McKiernan, late of Tevereoghe alias Aghewynaghe in County Cavan was seised of two polls of land called Tevereoghe alias Aghewynaghe. He died 1 March 1623. John McKiernan, his son and heir, was then aged 15 years old and unmarried.

In the Plantation of Ulster by grant dated 27 February 1610, along with other lands, King James VI and I granted one poll of Mullaghsiffin to William O'Shereden, gentleman, Cheefe of his Name. William Sheridan was the chief of the Sheridan Clan in County Cavan. He was the son of the previous chief, Hugh Duff O'Sheridan of Togher townland, Kilmore parish, County Cavan. William was the ancestor of the famous Sheridan theatrical family. William died sometime before 1638 leaving two sons, Owen (of Mullaghmore, Tullyhunco townland, Kildallan parish) and Patrick (of Raleagh townland, Kildallan parish). Owen Sheridan succeeded to his father's lands and this was confirmed by a grant to him by Charles I of England dated 6 March 1637. Owen's son Denis was born in 1612 and became a Catholic priest in charge of Kildrumferton parish, County Cavan. He later converted to Protestantism and on 10 June 1634 William Bedell, the Protestant Bishop of Kilmore, ordained him as a Minister of the Church of Ireland and two days later Denis was collated to the Vicarage of Killasser in the Diocese of Kilmore. Denis had several children, including William Sheridan (Bishop of Kilmore and Ardagh) 1682-1691 (his son Donald kept up the Templeport connection by marrying Mrs Enery of Bawnboy); Patrick Sheridan, Cloyne, Protestant Bishop of Cloyne (1679-1682) and Sir Thomas Sheridan (politician) Chief Secretary of State for Ireland (1687-1688).

The aforesaid Owen Sheridan took part in the Irish Rebellion of 1641. At Cavan, on 26 July 1642, Thomas Jones and his son William Jones stated- .

In the Plantation of Ulster by grant dated 16 August 1611, King James VI and I granted, inter alia, part of Aghaweenagh to Thomas Jones-1 poll in Tewrevy to Thomas Johnes, gentleman. At Cavan, on 26 July 1642, The aforesaid Thomas Jones and his son William Jones gave the names of rebel leaders in the Cavan Irish Rebellion of 1641, including . They also stated- .

After the Irish Rebellion of 1641 concluded, the townland was confiscated from the McKiernans and Sheridans in the Cromwellian Settlement and the 1652 Commonwealth Survey lists it as belonging to James Thornton. A confirming grant dated 30 January 1668 from King Charles II of England to James Thornton included 156 acres and 6 perches in Aghweenagh. A grant dated 9 September 1669 from King Charles II of England to Arthur Annesley, 1st Earl of Anglesey included, inter alia, part of Aughweenagh containing 71 acres and one rood at an annual rent of £0-19s-1 1/2d. The townland remained as part of the estate of the Thorntons of Greenville House, Aghaweenagh until 5 September 1863 when they were sold. Greenville House was described in the sale advert as- . The Thornton estate papers are now in Cavan Archives Service and those papers mentioning Aghaweenagh are at reference numbers P016/005; P016/006 and P016/018. In the Hearth Money Rolls compiled on 29 September 1663, there was one Hearth Tax payer in Aghowynagh- William Soath.

A Lease dated 1 October 1731 for two poles of Achaweenagh, Parish of Killdallan, Co. Cavan was made between James Thornton, Achaweenagh, Co. Cavan
and Luke Standford of Belturbett. Witnessed by Daniel Winslow of Derrymore, Co. Fermanagh and Robert Stanford of Belturbett.

In the Cavan Poll Book of 1761, there was one person registered to vote in Aghaweenagh in the Irish general election, 1761 - Abraham Brown. He was entitled to cast two votes. The four election candidates were Charles Coote, 1st Earl of Bellomont and  Lord Newtownbutler (later Brinsley Butler, 2nd Earl of Lanesborough), both of whom were then elected Member of Parliament for Cavan County. The losing candidates were George Montgomery (MP) of Ballyconnell and Barry Maxwell, 1st Earl of Farnham. Absence from the poll book either meant a resident did not vote or more likely was not a freeholder entitled to vote, which would mean most of the inhabitants of Aghaweenagh.

The 1790 Cavan Carvaghs list spells the name as Aghuenagh.

The Tithe Applotment Books 1823-1837 list five tithepayers in the townland. and 

The Aghaweenagh Valuation Office books are available for 1838.

Griffith's Valuation of 1857 lists eleven landholders in the townland.

In 1863 Aghaweenagh was sold by the Thornton estate to Lord Charles Beresford. On 5 July 1870 Beresford sold the townland. Aghaweenagh was described in the sale advert as- LOT No 4. This Lot comprises the Townland of Aughaweenagh containing 375a Or 38p statute measure held in fee simple and a portion of the Townland of Killygreagh containing 38a 3r 24p statute measure held under fee farm grants and portions of the Townland of Ardlogher held respectively under a fee farm grant and a lease for lives and includes the House and Demesne of Greenville. The House is handsome modern substantially built in excellent order well supplied with water and fit for the immediate reception of a large family. The Offices are well and substantially built. The Garden walled in large and abundantly supplied with fruit trees of every description. The Demesne Lands are of prime quality beautifully diversified and ornamented with Forest and other Timber. The Post office of Ardlogher immediately adjoins Greenville which is within a convenient distance of two Railway Stations and in a very quiet and desirable neighbourhood within three Irish miles of Ballyconnell where eleven Fairs are held annually, four of Killeshandra which has seven Fairs annually and five of Belturbet which has twelve Fairs annually. All Market and Post Towns. There is a valuable Turf Bog on this Lot. The Timber on this Lot is exclusive of Ornamental Timber very valuable. It was valued some years since by Mr Thomas Webb at £2,000.

The 1938 Dúchas folklore collection mentions a treasure hunt by Mr. Berry from Greenville c.1740.

Census

In the 1901 census of Ireland, there are eight families listed in the townland.

In the 1911 census of Ireland, there are eleven families listed in the townland.

Antiquities

 Greenville House.

References

External links
 The IreAtlas Townland Data Base

Townlands of County Cavan